This may refer to:
Tetrahedral-octahedral honeycomb - Uniform honeycomb with regular tetrahedral and octahedral cells
Tetragonal disphenoid honeycomb - Uniform dual honeycomb with tetragonal disphenoid cells
Phyllic disphenoidal honeycomb  - Uniform dual honeycomb with phyllic disphenoid cells